In Greek mythology, Mysius (Ancient Greek: Μύσιος) was a figure meant to provide an etiology for Mysia as a surname of Demeter. He was said to have received Demeter hospitably in his home in Argos as she was searching for Persephone, and to have founded a sanctuary of Demeter Mysia, known as "Mysaeum", located at the distance of about sixty stadia from Pellene; another temple of Demeter Mysia was reportedly situated on the road from Mycenae to Argos.

Mysius is portrayed on a relief uncovered in Lerna alongside Demeter and Chrysanthis: the latter was presumably seen as his daughter or wife.

Notes

References 

 Pausanias, Description of Greece with an English Translation by W.H.S. Jones, Litt.D., and H.A. Ormerod, M.A., in 4 Volumes. Cambridge, MA, Harvard University Press; London, William Heinemann Ltd. 1918. . Online version at the Perseus Digital Library
 Pausanias, Graeciae Descriptio. 3 vols. Leipzig, Teubner. 1903.  Greek text available at the Perseus Digital Library.

Demeter
Mythology of Argos